Annelies Schilhan (born 12 March 1936) is an Austrian former figure skater who competed in ladies' singles. She was a three-time Austrian national champion (1952–1954) and finished 16th at the 1952 Winter Olympics. She placed fourth at the 1954 European Championships. She belonged to EK Engelmann in Vienna.

Results

References

Austrian female single skaters
Figure skaters at the 1952 Winter Olympics
Olympic figure skaters of Austria
1938 births
Living people
Figure skaters from Vienna